Christy Obekpa now Mrs Aremu (born 15 December 1971) is a Nigerian judoka who competed in the women's half heavyweight category. She won a bronze medal at the 1990 Commonwealth Judo Games and a silver medal at the 1992 CW Judo Championships. Mrs Aremu is the first woman Nigeria judo commonwealth medalist. She also won two bronze medals at the 1999 All-Africa Games  and a bronze medal at the 2000 African Judo Championships.

Sports career 
In 1990, at the Commonwealth Judo Championships held in Auckland, New Zealand. She participated in a 72 kg event where she won a bronze medal. At the 1992 Commonwealth Judo Championships held in Cardiff, Wales. She also participated and won the silver medal in the 72kg event.

At the 1999 All-Africa Games in Johannesburg, Obekpa participated in the 78kg and Open event, winning two bronze medals.

At the 2000 African Judo Championships held in Algiers, Algeria, Obekpa won a bronze medal also in the 78kg event. She also participated in the Open event and came in 7th place.

References

External links 
Christy Obekpa

Living people
1971 births
Nigerian female judoka
Competitors at the 1999 All-Africa Games
Commonwealth Games medallists in judo
Commonwealth Games bronze medallists for Nigeria
Judoka at the 1990 Commonwealth Games
African Games bronze medalists for Nigeria
African Games medalists in judo
20th-century Nigerian women
21st-century Nigerian women
Medallists at the 1990 Commonwealth Games